Serhei Nudnyi (born 6 October 1980 in Rozdilna, Ukrainian SSR) is a Moldovan football midfielder who last played for Hirnyk Kryvyi Rihk in the Ukrainian First League.

Career
He is the product of the Tiraspol youth soccer school system. He signed a one-year contract with Ukrainian club Chornomorets in February 2009.

References

External links 
 Championat.ru profile
 
 

1980 births
Living people
Moldovan people of Ukrainian descent
Moldovan footballers
Moldovan expatriate footballers
Expatriate footballers in Georgia (country)
Expatriate footballers in Belarus
Expatriate footballers in Israel
Expatriate footballers in Ukraine
Moldovan expatriate sportspeople in Ukraine
FC Sheriff Tiraspol players
CS Tiligul-Tiras Tiraspol players
FC Zestafoni players
FC Dinamo Minsk players
Hapoel Rishon LeZion F.C. players
FC Chornomorets Odesa players
FC Feniks-Illichovets Kalinine players
FC Sevastopol players
FC Hoverla Uzhhorod players
FC Tytan Armyansk players
FC Hirnyk Kryvyi Rih players
Association football midfielders